On 28 August 1952 the then NATO member states signed the Paris Protocol  in Paris.
Its official title is "On the Status of International Military Headquarters Set up Pursuant to the North Atlantic Treaty" and it establishes
the status of allied and national headquarters and respective procedures. The Protocol is part of the so-called NATO legal acquis.

All NATO member states have ratified the protocol, except Canada, which signed but did not ratify it. France ratified the protocol in 1955 but denounced its ratification in 1966.

See also 
 Headquarter Protocol

External links 
Text of the treaty
Treaty ratifications.

NATO treaties
Treaties concluded in 1952
Treaties entered into force in 1954
1952 in France
Treaties of Albania
Treaties of Belgium
Treaties of Bulgaria
Treaties of Croatia
Treaties of the Czech Republic
Treaties of Denmark
Treaties of Estonia
Treaties of West Germany
Treaties of the Kingdom of Greece
Treaties of Hungary
Treaties of Iceland
Treaties of Italy
Treaties of Latvia
Treaties of Lithuania
Treaties of Luxembourg
Treaties of the Netherlands
Treaties of Norway
Treaties of Poland
Treaties of the Estado Novo (Portugal)
Treaties of Romania
Treaties of Slovakia
Treaties of Slovenia
Treaties of Spain
Treaties of Turkey
Treaties of the United Kingdom
Treaties of the United States